Noëllet is a former commune in the Maine-et-Loire department in western France. On 15 December 2016, it was merged into the new commune Ombrée d'Anjou. Its population was 406 in 2019.

Geography
The river Verzée flows southeastward through the northern part of the commune.

Demography

See also
Communes of the Maine-et-Loire department

References

Former communes of Maine-et-Loire